Joseph Oriel Eaton, an American painter of portraits and figure subjects, both in oil and in water-colours, was born in 1829. His most famous work is his portrait of Herman Melville, author of the 1851 novel  Moby-Dick.

Personal life 
He was married to Emmaline (Emma) Goodwin, great-granddaughter of John Adams, and granddaughter of John Quincy Adams. The Eatons had five children:

 Son, Frank
 Son, William
 Daughter, Mary Nelson (c. 1869 – 1948), married Frank Howard Nelson on June 6, 1907, in Montclair, New Jersey.
 Daughter, Margaret, married to Swedish Count Henning Gustave Taube, who was a co-founder of Eaton Corporation and brother of Swedish Prime Minister Arvid Taube.
 Son, Harrison, but later known as Joseph Oriel Eaton II, born 1873 and a co-founder of Eaton Corporation

A granddaughter (or possibly step-granddaughter) named Margaret Comacho was married to John Stoye on November 6, 1911.

Works 

Among his exhibited works were:
Landscape: View on the Hudson. 1868.
Multiple portraits of John Means of Kentucky. 1868
Greek Water-Carrier. 1872.
Lady Godiva. 1874.
Looking through the Kaleidoscope. 1875.
His own Portrait. 1875. (National Academy of Design)
A portrait of daughter Mary at age 4 (Cincinnati Art Museum). c. 1874

Death and legacy
Eaton was elected into the National Academy of Design as an associate academician in 1866. He died in Yonkers, New York in 1875.

References

External links

"Joseph Oriel Eaton" at National Academy of Design

1829 births
1875 deaths
19th-century American male artists
19th-century American painters
American male painters
American portrait painters